German Schafkopf is an old German card game and the forerunner of the popular modern games of Skat, Doppelkopf and Bavarian Schafkopf.
Today it is hardly ever played in its original form, but there are a number of regional derivations.

History 

Schafkopf dates to the 18th century or earlier and is the oldest member of the Schafkopf family. A 1783 novel describes the scene after a wedding dinner as the dining tables were cleared away and replaced by games tables: "here stood an Ombre table, there a noble Schafkopf was played, over there a game of forfeits, soon everybody was busy playing when suddenly the sound of the strings announced the arrival of the dance band..." In 1796, we learn that students at Leipzig University liked to repair to disreputable bars to play Solo or Schafkopf for a couple of Dreiers.
In 1811, it is described as "a cute little game [played] with chalk and collection bag pennies". and its rules are recorded for the first time. In 1853, these rules are reproduced by  Von Alvensleben who describes 'Schaafkopf' as being very common, especially with the lower classes perhaps due to its ordinary name ("sheep's head"), but that it also went under the "more noble" names of Society (Societätsspiel), Conversation (Conversationsspiel) or Denunciation (Denunciationsspiel). He hypothesises that the name comes from the practice of drawing the lines denoting points scored in the form of a stylised sheep's head. He goes on to describe in detail no less than nine variants of 'Schaafkopf' (in addition to Wendish Schafkopf), but states clearly that the original one was a four-hand, point-trick, team game with 4 Unters as top trumps, known as Wenzels (pronounced "Ventsels") and a trump suit nominated by the bid winner. The game was normally played for beer. Other variants for four, six or eight players variously use six Wenzels (two Obers and four Unters) or eight Wenzels (four Obers and four Unters). Some use Bells as the permanent trump suit and at least one is a plain-trick game, otherwise they are Ace-Ten games with the Tens ranking low. The variants (with von Alversleben's lettering in brackets) are shown in brief below. Except where indicated, they are played by teams of two, in fixed partnerships, with 32 cards and variable trump suits, and are point-trick games:

 Four players, four Wenzels (A) – Urschafkopf or Ur-Schafkopf
 Four players, six Wenzels (C)
 Four players, eight Wenzels (D)
 Four players, four Wenzels, Bells, no teams, plain-trick (B) – Schellen-Schafkopf
 Four players, six Wenzels, Bells (E)
 Six players, six Wenzels, Bells, 36 cards (F)
 Four players, twelve Wenzels, Bells, 2 x 24 cards (G)
 Six players, twelve Wenzels, Bells, 2 x 24 cards  (H)
 Eight players, sixteen Wenzels, Bells, 2 x 32 cards (I)

No. 3 has the same configuration as modern Bavarian Schafkopf, although the latter has Hearts as permanent trumps in the 'normal game', alliances rather than partnerships and various solo contracts. Modern Wendish Schafkopf resembles no. 5 but has eight Wenzels; likewise Doppelkopf looks like an evolution of no. 7 taking it from 12 to 16 Wenzels and adding 2 x 10s, which are the highest cards in the double pack.

John McLeod notes that many German game books include rules for German Schafkopf based on the original, but he is not aware of anywhere that it is still played. However his research has uncovered two descendants of the game lingering on in the Palatinate region of western Germany. One is Bauernstoss which is played in Erfweiler and the other is Alter Schoofkopp played in Niederhochstadt, around 30 kilometres to the east.

The Palatinate is also home to Bauerchen or Bauersches, a four-player, partnership game in which the four Jacks are top trumps in the usual Skat/Schafkopf order. It is played with a short pack (20 cards), forehand calls trumps and leads to the first trick. Melds for a King-Queen pair earn extra points.

It is a plain trick game in which players bid the number of potential trumps they have.

Rules 
The following rules appear to be based on Grupp (1994) and resemble those of the original Schafkopf game, i.e. von Alversleben's Type A above.

Cards

Players and cards 
German Schafkopf is played with 4 players and 32 cards which, depending on the region, may be German or French packs. The players form 2 permanent partnerships.

{| class="wikitable"  style="float:right; text-align:center"
 |- style ="background:#B3B7FF"
 | colspan="4" | Suits of the French suited cards 
|- style="background-color: #E3E3E3"
 | | Diamonds (Karo) 
 | Hearts (Herz) 
 | Spades (Pik) 
 | Clubs (Kreuz)
 |- style="background-color:#FFF" 
 | 
 | 
 | 
 | 
 |-  style ="background:#B3B7FF"
 | colspan="4" | Suits of the German suited cards
 |- style="background: #E3E3E3;"
 | | [[Bells (card suit)|Bells (Schellen)]] || Hearts (Herz) || Leaves (Laub) || Acorns (Eichel)
 |- style="background-color:#FFF"
 | | 
 | | 
 | | 
 | | 
 |- style ="background:#B3B7FF"
|}

 Card values 

 Card ranking 

The ranking of cards within the individual suits is as follows (highest to lowest):
Ace (Deuce) > King > Queen (Ober) > 10 > 9 > 8 > 7

The hierarchy of the cards and their sequence within the trumps are similar to those in Bavarian Schafkopf and Skat. However, in German Schafkopf the 10 ranks between the Queen or Ober and 9, in all suits even though it is worth ten points.

 Trumps 

As in Skat, the highest trumps are the 4 Jacks or Unters in the sequence Clubs, Spades, Hearts and Diamonds or Acorns, Leaves, Hearts and Bells. The remaining trumps are specified by the player who is the declarer by naming the trump suit at the outset. The cards of the trump suit then follow in the aforementioned sequence (see above).

 Partnerships 
German Schafkopf is a partnership card game, but unlike Bavarian Schafkopf or Doppelkopf partners are not announced during the course of the game, but are permanent as in Bridge: the players facing one another are automatically partners. The seating order is determined by the drawing of playing cards before the game begins: the players who have picked the two highest cards are partners and sit opposite one another. In another variation, the players with the two black queens (or Ober of Acorns and Ober of Leaves) form a partnership (see below).

 Rules 

 Dealing 
After the cards have been shuffled and cut, each player is dealt a total of eight playing cards (in two sets of four) in clockwise fashion.

 Declarations 
After the deal, starting clockwise each player announces the maximum possible number of trumps in their hand by adding the jacks and the longest suit ("I declare x trumps").

The player with the highest number of possible trumps takes the lead in the game and names the trump suit.

If two players announce the same number of possible trumps, then the one with the higher number of trump points wins ("I declare x trumps with y points"); if this number is also the same, the higher trump wins (usually the higher jack).

 Forced game 
If none of the players can declare at least five trumps, the player with the Jack of Clubs (Unter of Acorns) must take the lead; if he loses, it only counts as single (i.e. he doesn't lose double or quadruple) game points.

 Solo games 
As in Bavarian Schafkopf and Doppelkopf, solo games are also possible in German Schafkopf. Here, a solo player plays against the other three players.

 Play 
Players must follow suit. If a player cannot do so, any card may be played.

 Scoring 

There are three types of games won:

 Straight win (61 to 89 points scored): if the winner chose trumps he gets one game point, otherwise he gets two 
 Schneider win (more than 90 points scored): if the winner chose trumps he gets two game points, otherwise four
 Schwarz win (opponents have no tricks): the winner gets nine game points, regardless of who chose trumps (nine dashes correspond to a whole sheep's head).

In a forced game, however, a winner who did not choose trumps gets the same as one who did.

For each game point won, the winner draws a line on a sheet of paper. The game is won by the first player to complete draw nine dashes in the shape of a sheep's head, the Schafkopf: four dashes arranged in a rectangle form the shape of the head, two dashes form the eyes, two more the horns and a single dash in the middle represents the nose. Presumably the losers buy the beer.

 Variants 
The game described is the earliest form of German Schafkopf. Apart from Bavarian Schafkopf and the other early variants mentioned above, further variants have been developed, some in different regions. These include:

 Blattla, no Wenzels, Hearts as permanent trumps
 Bierkopf, a Franconian variant of modern Schafkopf with fixed teams and no solos
 Mucken, another Franconian variant with different contracts
 Bauernstoß, which is played in the Palatine region of Erfweiler.
 Alte Schoofkopp, played in Niederhochstadt, another village in the Palatinate.

In an East German book of game rules there are the following variations of German Schafkopf which appear to reflect, in part, von Alversleben's variants:

Classic Schafkopf: as described, Jacks/Wenzel are always trumps, the player with the so-called 'old man', the Jack of Clubs or the Unter of Acorns, must choose trumps if all pass or cannot bid more than 5 trumps.
Schafkopf with six (eight) Wenzeln and changing trumps: Queen of Clubs (Ober of Acorns) and Queen of Spades (Ober of Leaves) (and Queen of Hearts (Ober of Hearts) and Queen of Diamonds (Ober of Bells)) are declared as trumps and outrank the old man. The player with the old man calls trumps, if this has not been decided beforehand by the bidding process.
Schafkopf with four (six, eight) Wenzels and remaining trumps: Jacks/Wenzel (plus the 2 highest Queens/Obers or all 4) and Diamonds/Bells are always trumps.

 Related games 
There are numerous European relatives of the family:
 Kop is a Polish game is played with just 16 cards, with four per player by excluding all but the Ace, 10s, Queens, and Jacks.
 Sjavs is popular in the Faroe Islands where it is played with 32 cards.
 Scharwenzel is an old German game, possibly ancestral to German Schafkopf. It is now only played on the island of Fehmarn and, as Skærvindsel, in Denmark.

 See also 
 Officers' Schafkopf

 Footnotes 

 References 

 Literature 
 _ (1988). Spielregelbüchlein mit Skatordnung. p. 177, 8th edn., Spielkartenfabrik Altenburg.
 Bruckmann, Karl (1811). Karl Bruckmann oder William Sterne, Findling des Harzgebirges und Bewohner einer einsamen Insel der Südsee, Part 2, J.D. Schöps, Zittau and Leipzig.
 Danyliuk, Rita (2008). 1 × 1 der Kartenspiele - Bridge, Skat und Schafkopf. Glücks- und Familienspiele. Patiencen, Kartentricks u.v.m. Humboldt, Baden-Baden,  
 Danyliuk, Rita (2008). Das große Taschenbuch der Freizeitspiele: Spiele für unterwegs und Schönwettertage, Munich: Humboldt, pp. 149-151.
 Grupp, Claus D. (1997). Doppelkopf - Schafkopf - Tarock. Original edition. Falken, Niedernhausen/ Ts., 1997, 
 Hammer, Paul (1811). Taschenbuch der Kartenspiele, Weygandschen Buchhandlung, Leipzig.
 McLeod, John (1978). "Rules of Games: No. 8. Schafkopf" in The Journal of the Playing-Card Society'', Vol. VII, No. 2. pp. 38-47. ISSN 0305-2133.
 Von Alvensleben, L. (1853). Encyclopädie der Spiele. Otto Wigand, Leipzig.

External links 
 Bauernstoss at www.pagat.com. 

Schafkopf group
German deck card games
French deck card games
Four-player card games
Point-trick games